The following squads were named for the 1953 South American Championship that took place in Peru.

Bolivia
 Ricardo Alcón
 Víctor Brown
 José Bustamante
 René Cabrera
 Delfín Díaz
 Eduardo González
 Benigno Gutiérrez
 Eduardo Gutiérrez
 Hilarion López
 Mario Mena
 Arturo Miranda
 Javier Palazuelos
 Máximo Ramírez
 Raúl Reinoso
 Ricardo Sánchez
 Ramón Santos
 Víctor Agustín Ugarte
 Antonio Valencia
 Edgar Vargas

Brazil
 Barbosa
 Castilho
 Gilmar
 Djalma Santos
 Haroldo
 Nílton Santos
 Alfredo
 Bauer
 Brandãozinho
 Danilo Alvim
 Didi
 Ely
 Pinheiro
 Zizinho
 Ademir
 Baltazar
 Cláudio Pinho
 Ipojucan
 Julinho
 Pinga
 Rodrigues

Chile
 Sergio Livingstone
 Manuel Alvarez
 Valentín Beperet
 Arturo Farías
 Alfredo Olivos
 Fernando Roldán
 Augusto Arenas
 Óscar Carrasco
 Ramiro Cortés
 Enrique Hormazábal
 Carlos Rojas
 Osvaldo Sáez
 Atilio Cremaschi
 Guillermo Díaz
 Fernando Hurtado
 René Meléndez
 Francisco Molina
 Carlos Tello

Ecuador
 Víctor Arteaga
 José Vicente Balseca
 Alfredo Bonnard
 Sigifredo Chuchuca
 Raúl Pío de la Torre
 Jorge Delgado
 Jorge Enríquez
 Enrique Flores
 Eduardo Guzmán
 Jorge Henríquez
 Jorge Izaguirre
 Mario Lovato
 Rafael Maldonado
 Luis Marañón
 Heráclides Marín
 Daniel Pinto
 Ricardo Riveros
 Pablo Salazar
 Carlos Sánchez
 Galo Solís
 César Solórzano
 José Vargas
 Orlando Zambrano

Paraguay
 Alejandro Arce
 Milner Ayala
 Ángel Berni
 Antonio Cabrera
 Rubén Fernández
 Manuel Gavilán
 Antonio Ramón Gómez
 Inocencio González
 Ireneo Hermosilla
 Heriberto Herrera
 Luis Lacasa
 Victoriano Leguizamón
 Pablo León
 Atilio López
 Robustiano Maciel
 Domingo Martínez
 Derlis Molinas
 Rubén Noceda
 Melanio Olmedo
 Silvio Parodi
 Carlos Adolfo Riquelme
 Juan Angel Romero

Peru
 José Allen
 Rafael Asca
 Guillermo Barbadillo
 Juan Bassa
 César Brush
 Luis Calderón
 Roberto Castillo
 Guillermo Delgado
 Roberto Drago
 Óscar Gómez Sánchez
 Rafael Goyeneche
 Cornelio Heredia
 Luis Navarrete
 Arturo Reyes
 Manuel Rivera
 Alberto Terry
 Gilberto Torres
 Ernesto Villamares

Uruguay
 Osvaldo Balseiro
 Raúl Bentancor
 Néstor Carballo
 Humberto Cardozo
 Carlos María Carranza
 Luis Alberto Cruz
 Matías González
 William Ruben Martínez
 Omar Pedro Méndez
 Rubén Morán
 Walter Morel
 Donald Peláez
 Washington Puente
 Julio Quiroga
 Luis Radiche
 Urbano Rivera
 Domingo Rodríguez
 Pedro Rodríguez
 Carlos Romero
 Hosiriz Romero
 Rafael Souto
 Ruben Vanoli

References

Squads
Copa América squads